Francisco de Borja Pérez-Peñas Díaz-Mauriño (born 1 April 1982), known as Borja, is a Spanish retired professional footballer who played as a forward.

He made 129 Segunda División appearances and scored 14 goals, for Leganés, Alicante, Alcorcón and Tenerife. He added 185 games and 60 goals in the Segunda División B for five teams, and played one season for Kilmarnock in the Scottish Premier League.

Club career

Early years and Alcorcón
Borja was born in Madrid. After a brief passage at Real Madrid's academy he made his senior debut with neighbours CD Leganés, scoring five goals in 37 games in an eventual 2004 relegation from the Segunda División.

Borja moved to Real Valladolid in summer 2005, but could only appear for its reserves during his spell, being loaned to Alicante CF in his second year after which he was released. He joined the same team permanently – still in the Segunda División B – helping to promotion in his third season.

In the 2009 off-season, following Alicante's relegation, Borja stayed in the third division, joining AD Alcorcón. On 27 October, he scored twice against Real Madrid in the Copa del Rey in a final 4–0 home rout, taking his tally against this club to six (he had netted already four times in different editions of the tournament); Alcorcón won 4–1 on aggregate.

Kilmarnock
On 16 August 2012, it was announced that Borja had signed for Scottish Premier League side Kilmarnock on a one-year deal, after spending some weeks on trial. He made his debut two days later, coming on as a substitute in a 1–2 home loss against Motherwell.

Borja's first goal came from a penalty to give his team a 2–0 lead in an eventual 3–1 victory over Dundee United, also at Rugby Park.

Later career
In May 2013, Borja extended his contract with the East Ayrshire club until 2015. Kilmarnock changed manager the following month however, and, in August, he returned to his country after transferring to CD Tenerife.

Having gone scoreless in his season in the Canary Islands, Borja played out the last two years of his career with smaller teams in his native region, CF Fuenlabrada (third tier) and UD San Sebastián de los Reyes (Tercera División).

Personal life
In a 2012 interview, Borja revealed he had a law degree and a Master's degree in order to become a lawyer.

References

External links

1982 births
Living people
Spanish footballers
Footballers from Madrid
Association football forwards
Segunda División players
Segunda División B players
Tercera División players
CD Leganés B players
CD Leganés players
Real Valladolid Promesas players
Alicante CF footballers
AD Alcorcón footballers
CD Tenerife players
CF Fuenlabrada footballers
UD San Sebastián de los Reyes players
Scottish Premier League players
Kilmarnock F.C. players
Spanish expatriate footballers
Expatriate footballers in Scotland
Spanish expatriate sportspeople in Scotland